The 7×20mm Nambu is a rimless, bottleneck handgun cartridge designed in Japan for use in the Type B or "Baby" model Nambu pistol.  The cartridge is a scaled-down version of the 8×22mm Nambu used in all other Nambu pistol models. It has a muzzle energy more than a .25 ACP and close to the .32 ACP.

References

 The Hand Cannons of Imperial Japan, Derby, H., 1981, Taylor Publishing Company, ISBN 0-940424-00-2
 The Weapons Series no. 5 THE BABY NAMBU Japanese 7-mm. Pistol, Marsh, Roger, 1946, Pub. by the author.

Pistol and rifle cartridges
Military cartridges
World War II infantry weapons of Japan